Lhagba La or Lhakpa La (meaning "Windy Gap") is a  col about  northeast of Mount Everest in the Tibet Autonomous Region.

It was unknown to local inhabitants until it was discovered and named by the 1921 British Mount Everest reconnaissance expedition when reconnoitring a route to climb the mountain.
Lhagba La is the starting point of the Kharta Glacier which descends eastwards along the valley towards Kharta. The Kharta River is a tributary of the Arun River. On the western side of the col is the East Rongbuk Glacier which flows north from Everest.

Expeditions attempting Everest via the North Col generally arrive up the East Rongbuk Glacier and so do not reach Lhagba La at all. However, when George Mallory and Guy Bullock were trying to reach the North Col, the route from Rongbuk was unknown to them.

The well-known Yeti footprints were found in this region for the first time in the world probably at the beginning of 19th century. Later it came up into the light through the media. This mystery of "Yeti" is still unsolved.

References

Mount Everest
Mountain passes of the Himalayas
Mountain passes of Tibet
Mountain passes of China